Gymnosoma clavatum is a species of tachinid flies in the genus Gymnosoma of the family Tachinidae.

Distribution
This species can be found in most of Europe, up to Central Asia and the Middle East. It is not present in the United Kingdom.

Description

These flies have  a black thorax, but males have a mesonotum with golden pruinosity up to the transverse suture. Scutellum is black with two pairs of marginal setae  and a quite characteristic red sub-globular abdomen, without setae but with large black markings in the middle. In the females thorax before the scutellum has three spots of dusting. Abdominal tergites are completely fused. The compound eyes are red. Antennae are black. Wings are slightly darkened, with yellow basicostae. Femora and tibiae  are black.

Biology
Adults can be found from May to October. These flies are endoparasites of various Pentatomidae species, on which the females lay their eggs. Larvae will develop inside them. Known larval hosts of these parasitic flies are Ancyrosoma leucogrammes, Carpocoris pudicus, Cydnus aterrimus, Dolycoris baccarum, Eurygaster integriceps, Nezara viridula, Palomena prasina, Piezodorus lituratus.

References

External links
  Barry Fotopage
 Animalandia

Diptera of Europe
Phasiinae
Insects described in 1947
Endoparasites
Taxa named by Boris Rohdendorf